Ketanggungan District is the name of an administrative district (Indonesian: Kecamatan) in Brebes Regency, Central Java, Indonesia. It covers 153.41 km2 and had a population of 133,770 at the 2010 Census and 144,524 at the 2020 Census.

References

Brebes Regency
Districts of Central Java